Lyrolepis is an extinct genus of prehistoric ray-finned fish found in the Eocene Adaev Formation of Kazakhstan and the Pshekha Formation of Georgia.

See also 
 Prehistoric fish
 List of prehistoric bony fish

References 

Elopiformes
Prehistoric ray-finned fish genera
Eocene fish of Asia
Oligocene fish of Asia
Fossils of Georgia (country)
Fossils of Kazakhstan